Patrick Joseph McReavy (January 16, 1918 – November 13, 2001) was a Canadian professional ice hockey player who played 55 games in the National Hockey League with the Boston Bruins and Detroit Red Wings between 1938 and 1942. The rest of his career, which lasted from 1938 to 1952, was spent in various minor leagues.

In 1939, he played in six regular season games for the Bruins, never appearing in the playoffs, but Boston still engraved his name on the Stanley Cup. He would win the Stanley Cup again with the Bruins in 1941, scoring two goals in the postseason.  To date, McReavy is the only Bruin in the team's long history to score two playoff goals while never scoring a regular-season goal for the club.

As a member of the Sudbury Wolves he played for Canada at the 1938 World Championships, scoring 2 goals and 1 assist in 7 games and winning the gold medal. McReavy was born in Owen Sound, Ontario.

Career statistics

Regular season and playoffs

International

External links

"Europe no place for a small-town hockey player in 1938" - Owen Sound-Times biographical article
Obituary at LostHockey.com

1918 births
2001 deaths
Boston Bruins players
Canadian ice hockey centres
Detroit Red Wings players
Hershey Bears players
Ice hockey people from Ontario
Ontario Hockey Association Senior A League (1890–1979) players
Providence Reds players
Sportspeople from Owen Sound
St. Louis Flyers players
Stanley Cup champions
Toronto St. Michael's Majors players
Valleyfield Braves players